The Lami Mosque is one of the six mosques in Ulcinj.

History
It was built by Hajji Alia in 1689. The Friday Khutbah is given in three languages, in Arabic, Albanian and Bosnian language. Next to the mosque is the gasulhane, where the bodies of the dead are washed in preparation for burial. The funeral xhenaze namaz follows washing.

In 1968, the anti-Albanian Yugoslav government wanted to destroy the mosque, but the bravery of Imam Ibrahim Llolla to stand in front of the Yugoslavian police saved the mosque, as he was ready to 	
sacrifice himself for the mosque. However, the Yugoslavian police destroyed another, the Meraja Mosque.

See also 
 List of mosques in Ulcinj

References

Mosques in Ulcinj
Ottoman architecture in Montenegro